Guillermo Aquilino Vento (born July 5, 1921) is a Venezuelan former professional baseball player.  Listed at 5' 8" (1.75 m), 165 lb (75 kg), Vento batted and threw right handed. He was born in Maracaibo, Zulia.

Basically a line-drive hitter and a fine defensive catcher, Vento also showed his versatility as a strong-armed third baseman, corner outfielder and first sacker, as well as a very good base runner. He was a member of the Venezuela national team that won gold medals in the 1941 and 1944 Baseball World Cup tournaments, helping his team to an upset victory over Cuba in 1941, while leading the 1944 edition with 14 runs scored.

In 1946, Vento entered the Venezuelan Professional Baseball League with the Cervecería Caracas club, playing for the franchise through the 1954–1955 season, after it was christened as the Leones del Caracas. During this span, he won three pennant titles with Caracas and played in three Caribbean Series. As a 25-year rookie, Vento hit a .286 batting average with five home runs and 21 RBI in 33 games, including a .476 slugging percentage, while improving to a .303 average in the 1946–1947 season.

On November 30, 1947, Vento became the first VPBL player to connect six hits in a single game. This record would eventually be matched by Pete Koegel (1974), Steve Carter (1991) and Ramón Flores (2014).

Vento was instrumental in the Cervecería championship during the 1948–1949 season, going 31-for-118 for a .269 average, including a 22-game hitting streak, while catching in 30 of the 31 games of his team. He then hit .375 for Cervecería in the 1949 Caribbean Series, good for third in the batting race behind Al Gionfriddo (.533) and Chuck Connors (.409).

His most productive season came in 1950–1951, when he batted .309 in 53 games, slugged .409, and posted career-numbers in hits (69) doubles (14),  RBI (34), runs (42) and total bases (96).

In between, Vento joined the Águilas Cibaeñas club of the now extinct Dominican Summer League in the 1952 season. He batted .327 and slugged .470 in 43 games to help his team win the pennant. Vento usually served as a battery mate for fellow country man Emilio Cueche in many games, including the 4–1 victory over the Tigres del Licey in the decisive seventh game of the final series, to give the Aguilas its first championship title in the long storied history of the franchise.

He later played from 1954 through 1958 for the Sultanes de Monterrey of the Mexican Summer League, where he posted a .271 average with 40 homers and 204 RBI in 410 games.

Vento collected .300 or more in four of his 19 seasons in the Venezuela winter league, with a career high .346 in 1958–1959, which was the fifth-best of the season, being surpassed only by Rudy Regalado (.366), Joe Collins (.360), Rod Graber (.350) and Bill Taylor. That season, Vento collected 50 total bases for a .481 slugging, also a personal mark for the 37-year-old veteran.

Besides, Vento played three seasons with the Licoreros de Pampero, returned to Caracas for the second time, and played his last season with the Tiburones de La Guaira in 1962–1963. He later coached and served as an instructor during the next four seasons.

At age 45, Vento made a special appearance for the Leones club in the 1966–1967 tournament, going 1-for-5, strictly in pinch-hitting duties.

In 2006, he received the honor of induction into the Venezuelan Baseball Hall of Fame and Museum as a member of the 1941 WBC Champion Team.

Batting statistics

Regular season

Postseason

Sources

External links
Venezuelan Professional Baseball League – Guillermo Vento career statistics
Estadísticas del Béisbol Mexicano – Guillermo Vento page
Baseball Reference MiLB – Guillermo Vento entry
La Patilla website – Hace 92 años nació Guillermo Vento (Spanish)
Leones del Caracas website – Historia del Caracas BBC (Spanish)
Juan F. Pérez Home Page – Las Series del Caribe (Spanish)

1921 births
Year of death missing
Águilas Cibaeñas players
Venezuelan expatriate baseball players in the Dominican Republic
Baseball catchers
Baseball outfielders
Baseball third basemen
Cervecería Caracas players
Leones del Caracas players
Licoreros de Pampero players
Sportspeople from Maracaibo
People from Zulia
Sultanes de Monterrey players
Tiburones de La Guaira players
Venezuelan expatriate baseball players in Mexico
Venezuelan people of Italian descent